Robert Knopwood (2 June 1763 – 18 September 1838) was an early clergyman and diarist in Australia.

Knopwood was the third child and only surviving son of Robert Knopwood (from a wealthy Norfolk family) and his wife Elizabeth, née Barton of Threxton, Norfolk, England. Knopwood was educated at Gonville and Caius College, Cambridge, and graduated B.A. in 1786, M.A. in 1790. Knopwood was ordained deacon in December 1788 and priest a year later. Having inherited a fortune as a young man, he became a member of the gambling set associated with the Prince Regent and quickly lost his money. He obtained a position as chaplain in the navy, and was appointed to Colonel Collins's expedition which, after the failure of the Port Phillip settlement, landed on the site of Hobart on 19 February 1804. Knopwood's salary as chaplain to the settlement was £182 10s. per annum. He was appointed a magistrate on the following 17 March.

Knopwood kept a diary for more than 30 years.
It is now in the Mitchell Library at Sydney, an interesting first-hand record of early Tasmania. From it we learn of the want of food and other hardships of the pioneers, the troubles with indigenous people band bushrangers, and the slowly improving conditions. It was a brutal, hard-drinking, hard-swearing age, and Knopwood does not appear to have been in advance of his time. He records dreadful floggings of convicts for comparatively trifling offences without indignation, and probably as a magistrate ordered them himself. On the other hand, he interested himself in two boys both under 18 years of age, who had been condemned to death and succeeded in getting them reprieved at the foot of the gallows. He tells us that he took them to a room and prayed with them, and that everyone thanked him for what he had done.

Knopwood obtained seeds from England and was an early cultivator of wheat, oats, vegetables and fruit. As the population grew Knopwood's work increased, his salary was raised to £260 per annum in April 1817; but his health was not good and about this time Governor Lachlan Macquarie was complaining of his dissipation and inability to carry out his duties. In 1821 Knopwood wrote to Macquarie asking that he might retire on full pay on account of his failing eyesight. His resignation was accepted on 7 September 1822, a pension of £100 per annum was granted, and Sir Thomas Brisbane, who had succeeded Macquarie, was authorised to make Knopwood "such a grant of land as may be considered fair and reasonable". Knopwood moved to the east side of the Derwent and died on 18 September 1838.

Many years before Knopwood had adopted a little orphan girl about a year old of whom he became very fond. Her daughter erected a tombstone in Rokeby churchyard to the memory of Knopwood which describes him as "a steady and affectionate friend, a man of strict integrity and active benevolence, ever ready to relieve the distress and ameliorate the conditions of the afflicted".


In popular culture
 Chris Haywood portrayed Robert Knopwood in the film The Last Confession of Alexander Pearce (2008).
 The Outlaw Michael Howe aired in Australia on the ABC television network on 1 December 2013. Australian actor Matt Day portrayed Knopwood. He is only shown as a settler and magistrate - not a clergyman.

See also
Ocean, the ship that brought Knopwood from Port Phillip to Hobart

References

External links

1763 births
1838 deaths
People from Hobart
Australian memoirists
Australian diarists
18th-century English Anglican priests
19th-century Australian Anglican priests
Alumni of Gonville and Caius College, Cambridge
Settlers of Tasmania